Kushki Kuhna  is a town and the center of Kushki Kuhna District, Herat Province, Afghanistan.

References

See also
Herat Province

Populated places in Herat Province